Amersfoort Vathorst is a railway station on the Utrecht–Kampen railway between Amersfoort and Zwolle. It is located in north Amersfoort, Netherlands. The station is operated by the Nederlandse Spoorwegen (NS). The station opened 28 May 2006. The station has 3 tracks, 1 of which is for terminating trains from the Amersfoort direction. It is located in the area of the Vathorst and Hooglanderveen estates, which are still being built up.

Train services

The following train services call at Amersfoort Vathorst:

Bus services

External links
NS website 
Dutch Public Transport journey planner 

Vathorst
Railway stations opened in 2006
Railway stations on the Centraalspoorweg
2006 establishments in the Netherlands
Railway stations in the Netherlands opened in the 21st century